Dr. Robert Herbert Mills-Roberts (5 August 1862 – 27 November 1935) was a Welsh footballer. A Welsh international, he was a member of the Preston North End side which became known as "The Invincibles".

He was born at Ffestiniog on 5 August 1862 and educated at Friars School, Bangor and University College, Aberystwyth. As a student he played both association football and rugby football, but he eventually emerged as a first rate goalkeeper while studying at St Thomas's Hospital, London. He made the first of his eight appearances for Wales in 1885, and in 1887 was invited to play as an amateur for Preston North End in their FA Cup ties. He was a member of the Preston sides which were FA Cup Finalists in 1888 and FA Cup Winners in 1889. Their victory in the Cup in the 1888–89 season was achieved without conceding a single goal throughout, which was attributed to his goalkeeping skills. He also played for Barnes, Casuals, and Birmingham St George's. He retired in 1890, but was persuaded to make a last appearance for Wales in 1892.

Between 1884 and 1888, he made seven appearances for the Corinthians amateur club, including playing for Corinthian three times against Preston North End.

Mills-Roberts qualified as a doctor in July 1887, and the following year was appointed the house surgeon at Birmingham General Hospital. He later took a position with the hospital at the Dinorwic Slate Quarry, and served with the British Expeditionary Force in the First World War. At the end of his working career, he retired to Bournemouth, where aged 73 he died on 27 November 1935.

References

External links
Welsh Biography Online

1862 births
1935 deaths
People from Merionethshire
People educated at Friars School, Bangor
Alumni of Aberystwyth University
Welsh footballers
Wales international footballers
Association football goalkeepers
English Football League players
Aberystwyth Town F.C. players
Crusaders F.C. (London) players
Barnes Club footballers
Corinthian F.C. players
Casuals F.C. players
Birmingham St George's F.C. players
Warwick County F.C. players
Preston North End F.C. players
Gloucester City A.F.C. players
Llanberis F.C. players
Welsh surgeons
19th-century Welsh medical doctors
20th-century Welsh medical doctors
20th-century surgeons
FA Cup Final players